Kirkland Elementary School may refer to:
 Kirkland Elementary School - Kirkland, Arizona - Kirkland Elementary School District
 D. D. Kirkland Elementary School - Oklahoma City, Oklahoma - Putnam City Schools